Ikkitousen Strong Climb is a professional wrestling round-robin hardcore tournament held by Big Japan Pro Wrestling (BJW) with a span of two years to determine the best wrestler of BJW's Strong BJ division. The tournament was first held in 2014. The tournament differs from the Ikkitousen Deathmatch Survivor as it features matches of strong style format while the former tournament features deathmatch variations.

List of winners

2012
The 2012 Ikkitousen Strong Climb was held between February 26 and March 26, 2012.

2014
The 2014 Ikkitousen Strong Climb was held between May 17 and July 26, 2014.

2016
The 2016 Ikkitousen Strong Climb was held between March 6 and April 10, 2016.

2018
The 2018 Ikkitousen Strong Climb was held between March 8 and April 15, 2018. The Block A winner Daichi Hashimoto defended his BJW World Strong Heavyweight Championship against Block B winner Hideki Suzuki in the final round of the tournament on April 15, in which Suzuki defeated Hashimoto to win the title and the tournament.

2020
The 2020 Ikkitousen Strong Climb was held between March 3 and April 26, 2020. The Block A winner Daichi Hashimoto, also the BJW World Strong Heavyweight Champion, defeated Block C winner Quiet Storm in the final round of the tournament. Several events that were scheduled to showcase the tournament were cancelled due to the COVID-19 pandemic. The matches that were to take place on those events were scored as draws with each wrestler earning one point.

2021
The 2021 edition took place between March 3 and June 28.

2022
The 2022 Ikkitousen Strong Climb was held between January 5 and February 20, 2022.

See also
Ikkitousen Deathmatch Survivor
Saikyo Tag League
List of Big Japan Pro Wrestling tournaments

References

External links
Big Japan Pro Wrestling official website
Strong Climb League Tournament History

2012 establishments in Japan
Big Japan Pro Wrestling
Professional wrestling tournaments